A mycorrhiza (from Greek μύκης , "fungus", and ῥίζα , "root"; pl. mycorrhizae, mycorrhiza or mycorrhizas) is a symbiotic association between a fungus and a plant. The term mycorrhiza refers to the role of the fungus in the plant's rhizosphere, its root system. Mycorrhizae play important roles in plant nutrition, soil biology, and soil chemistry.

In a mycorrhizal association, the fungus colonizes the host plant's root tissues, either intracellularly as in arbuscular mycorrhizal fungi, or extracellularly as in ectomycorrhizal fungi. The association is sometimes mutualistic. In particular species or in particular circumstances, mycorrhizae may have a parasitic association with host plants.

Definition 

A mycorrhiza is a symbiotic association between a green plant and a fungus. The plant makes organic molecules such as sugars by photosynthesis and supplies them to the fungus, while the fungus supplies the plant with water and mineral nutrients, such as phosphorus, taken from the soil. Mycorrhizas are located in the roots of vascular plants, but mycorrhiza-like associations also occur in bryophytes and there is fossil evidence that early land plants that lacked roots formed arbuscular mycorrhizal associations. Most plant species form mycorrhizal associations, though some families like Brassicaceae and Chenopodiaceae cannot. Different forms for the association are detailed in the next section. The most common is the arbuscular type that is present in 70% of plant species, including many crop plants such as wheat and rice.

Evolution 

Fossil and genetic evidence indicate that mycorrhizae are ancient, potentially as old as the terrestrialization of plants. Genetic evidence indicates that all land plants share a single common ancestor, which appears to have quickly adopted mycorrhizal symbiosis, and research suggests that proto-mycorrhizal fungi were a key factor enabling plant terrestrialization. The 400 million year old Rhynie chert contains an assemblage of fossil plants preserved in sufficient detail that arbuscular mycorrhizae have been observed in the stems of Aglaophyton major, giving a lower bound for how late mycorrhizal symbiosis may have developed. Ectomycorrhizae developed substantially later, during the Jurassic period, while most other modern mycorrhizal families, including orchid and erchoid mycorrhizae, date to the period of angiosperm radiation in the Cretaceous period. There is genetic evidence that the symbiosis between legumes and nitrogen-fixing bacteria is an extension of mycorrhizal symbiosis. The modern distribution of mycorrhizal fungi appears to reflect an increasing complexity and competition in root morphology associated with the dominance of angiosperms in the Cenozoic Era, characterized by complex ecological dynamics between species.

Types 

Mycorrhizas are commonly divided into ectomycorrhizas and endomycorrhizas. The two types are differentiated by the fact that the hyphae of ectomycorrhizal fungi do not penetrate individual cells within the root, while the hyphae of endomycorrhizal fungi penetrate the cell wall and invaginate the cell membrane. Endomycorrhiza includes arbuscular, ericoid, and orchid mycorrhiza, while arbutoid mycorrhizas can be classified as ectoendomycorrhizas. Monotropoid mycorrhizas form a special category.

Ectomycorrhiza

Ectomycorrhizas, or EcM, are symbiotic associations between the roots of around 10% of plant families, mostly woody plants including the birch, dipterocarp, eucalyptus, oak, pine, and rose families, orchids, and fungi belonging to the Basidiomycota, Ascomycota, and Zygomycota. Some EcM fungi, such as many Leccinum and Suillus, are symbiotic with only one particular genus of plant, while other fungi, such as the Amanita, are generalists that form mycorrhizas with many different plants. An individual tree may have 15 or more different fungal EcM partners at one time. Thousands of ectomycorrhizal fungal species exist, hosted in over 200 genera. A recent study has conservatively estimated global ectomycorrhizal fungal species richness at approximately 7750 species, although, on the basis of estimates of knowns and unknowns in macromycete diversity, a final estimate of ECM species richness would probably be between 20,000 and 25,000.

Ectomycorrhizas consist of a hyphal sheath, or mantle, covering the root tip and a Hartig net of hyphae surrounding the plant cells within the root cortex. In some cases the hyphae may also penetrate the plant cells, in which case the mycorrhiza is called an ectendomycorrhiza. Outside the root, ectomycorrhizal extramatrical mycelium forms an extensive network within the soil and leaf litter.

Nutrients can be shown to move between different plants through the fungal network. Carbon has been shown to move from paper birch trees into Douglas-fir trees thereby promoting succession in ecosystems. The ectomycorrhizal fungus Laccaria bicolor has been found to lure and kill springtails to obtain nitrogen, some of which may then be transferred to the mycorrhizal host plant. In a study by Klironomos and Hart, Eastern White Pine inoculated with L. bicolor was able to derive up to 25% of its nitrogen from springtails. When compared with non-mycorrhizal fine roots, ectomycorrhizae may contain very high concentrations of trace elements, including toxic metals (cadmium, silver) or chlorine.

The first genomic sequence for a representative of symbiotic fungi, the ectomycorrhizal basidiomycete L. bicolor, was published in 2008. An expansion of several multigene families occurred in this fungus, suggesting that adaptation to symbiosis proceeded by gene duplication. Within lineage-specific genes those coding for symbiosis-regulated secreted proteins showed an up-regulated expression in ectomycorrhizal root tips suggesting a role in the partner communication. L. bicolor is lacking enzymes involved in the degradation of plant cell wall components (cellulose, hemicellulose, pectins and pectates), preventing the symbiont from degrading host cells during the root colonisation. By contrast, L. bicolor possesses expanded multigene families associated with hydrolysis of bacterial and microfauna polysaccharides and proteins. This genome analysis revealed the dual saprotrophic and biotrophic lifestyle of the mycorrhizal fungus that enables it to grow within both soil and living plant roots.

Arbutoid mycorrhiza

This type of mycorrhiza involves plants of the Ericaceae subfamily Arbutoideae. It is however different from ericoid mycorrhiza and resembles ectomycorrhiza, both functionally and in terms of the fungi involved. It differs from ectomycorrhiza in that some hyphae actually penetrate into the root cells, making this type of mycorrhiza an ectendomycorrhiza.

Endomycorrhiza

Endomycorrhizas are variable and have been further classified as arbuscular, ericoid, arbutoid, monotropoid, and orchid mycorrhizas.

Arbuscular mycorrhiza

Arbuscular mycorrhizas, (formerly known as vesicular-arbuscular mycorrhizas), have hyphae penetrate plant cells, producing structures that are either balloon-like (vesicles) or dichotomously branching invaginations (arbuscules) as a means of nutrient exchange. The fungal hyphae do not in fact penetrate the protoplast (i.e. the interior of the cell), but invaginate the cell membrane. The structure of the arbuscules greatly increases the contact surface area between the hypha and the cell cytoplasm to facilitate the transfer of nutrients between them. Arbuscular mycorrhizas are fungi that are obligate biotrophs, meaning that they use the plant host for both the growth and the reproduction. Twenty percent of the photosynthetic products made by the plant host are consumed by the fungi, the transfer of carbon from the terrestrial host plant is then exchanged by equal amounts of phosphate from the fungi to the plant host.

Arbuscular mycorrhizas are formed only by fungi in the division Glomeromycota. Fossil evidence and DNA sequence analysis suggest that this mutualism appeared 400-460 million years ago, when the first plants were colonizing land. Arbuscular mycorrhizas are found in 85% of all plant families, and occur in many crop species. The hyphae of arbuscular mycorrhizal fungi produce the glycoprotein glomalin, which may be one of the major stores of carbon in the soil. Arbuscular mycorrhizal fungi have (possibly) been asexual for many millions of years and, unusually, individuals can contain many genetically different nuclei (a phenomenon called heterokaryosis).

Ericoid mycorrhiza

Ericoid mycorrhizas are the third of the three more ecologically important types. They have a simple intraradical (growth in cells) phase, consisting of dense coils of hyphae in the outermost layer of root cells. There is no periradical phase and the extraradical phase consists of sparse hyphae that don't extend very far into the surrounding soil. They might form sporocarps (probably in the form of small cups), but their reproductive biology is poorly understood.

Ericoid mycorrhizas have also been shown to have considerable saprotrophic capabilities, which would enable plants to receive nutrients from not-yet-decomposed materials via the decomposing actions of their ericoid partners.

Orchid mycorrhiza

All orchids are myco-heterotrophic at some stage during their lifecycle, meaning that they can survive only if they form orchid mycorrhizas with basidiomycete fungi. Their hyphae penetrate into the root cells and form pelotons (coils) for nutrient exchange.

Monotropoid mycorrhiza

This type of mycorrhiza occurs in the subfamily Monotropoideae of the Ericaceae, as well as several genera in the Orchidaceae. These plants are heterotrophic or mixotrophic and derive their carbon from the fungus partner. This is thus a non-mutualistic, parasitic type of mycorrhizal symbiosis.

Mutualist dynamics

Mycorrhizal fungi form a mutualistic relationship with the roots of most plant species. In such a relationship, both the plants themselves and those parts of the roots that host the fungi, are said to be mycorrhizal. Relatively few of the mycorrhizal relationships between plant species and fungi have been examined to date, but 95% of the plant families investigated are predominantly mycorrhizal either in the sense that most of their species associate beneficially with mycorrhizae, or are absolutely dependent on mycorrhizae. The Orchidaceae are notorious as a family in which the absence of the correct mycorrhizae is fatal even to germinating seeds.

Recent research into ectomycorrhizal plants in boreal forests has indicated that mycorrhizal fungi and plants have a relationship that may be more complex than simply mutualistic. This relationship was noted when mycorrhizal fungi were unexpectedly found to be hoarding nitrogen from plant roots in times of nitrogen scarcity. Researchers argue that some mycorrhizae distribute nutrients based upon the environment with surrounding plants and other mycorrhizae. They go on to explain how this updated model could explain why mycorrhizae do not alleviate plant nitrogen limitation, and why plants can switch abruptly from a mixed strategy with both mycorrhizal and nonmycorrhizal roots to a purely mycorrhizal strategy as soil nitrogen availability declines. It has also been suggested that evolutionary and phylogenetic relationships can explain much more variation in the strength of mycorrhizal mutualisms than ecological factors.

Sugar-water/mineral exchange

The mycorrhizal mutualistic association provides the fungus with relatively constant and direct access to carbohydrates, such as glucose and sucrose. The carbohydrates are translocated from their source (usually leaves) to root tissue and on to the plant's fungal partners. In return, the plant gains the benefits of the mycelium's higher absorptive capacity for water and mineral nutrients, partly because of the large surface area of fungal hyphae, which are much longer and finer than plant root hairs, and partly because some such fungi can mobilize soil minerals unavailable to the plants' roots. The effect is thus to improve the plant's mineral absorption capabilities.

Unaided plant roots may be unable to take up nutrients that are chemically or physically immobilised; examples include phosphate ions and micronutrients such as iron. One form of such immobilization occurs in soil with high clay content, or soils with a strongly basic pH. The mycelium of the mycorrhizal fungus can, however, access many such nutrient sources, and make them available to the plants they colonize. Thus, many plants are able to obtain phosphate without using soil as a source. Another form of immobilisation is when nutrients are locked up in organic matter that is slow to decay, such as wood, and some mycorrhizal fungi act directly as decay organisms, mobilising the nutrients and passing some onto the host plants; for example, in some dystrophic forests, large amounts of phosphate and other nutrients are taken up by mycorrhizal hyphae acting directly on leaf litter, bypassing the need for soil uptake. Inga alley cropping, proposed as an alternative to slash and burn rainforest destruction, relies upon mycorrhiza within the root system of species of Inga to prevent the rain from washing phosphorus out of the soil.

In some more complex relationships, mycorrhizal fungi do not just collect immobilised soil nutrients, but connect individual plants together by mycorrhizal networks that transport water, carbon, and other nutrients directly from plant to plant through underground hyphal networks.

Suillus tomentosus, a basidiomycete fungus, produces specialized structures known as tuberculate ectomycorrhizae with its plant host lodgepole pine (Pinus contorta var. latifolia). These structures have been shown to host nitrogen fixing bacteria which contribute a significant amount of nitrogen and allow the pines to colonize nutrient-poor sites.

Mechanisms

The mechanisms by which mycorrhizae increase absorption include some that are physical and some that are chemical. Physically, most mycorrhizal mycelia are much smaller in diameter than the smallest root or root hair, and thus can explore soil material that roots and root hairs cannot reach, and provide a larger surface area for absorption. Chemically, the cell membrane chemistry of fungi differs from that of plants. For example, they may secrete organic acids that dissolve or chelate many ions, or release them from minerals by ion exchange. Mycorrhizae are especially beneficial for the plant partner in nutrient-poor soils.

Disease, drought and salinity resistance and its correlation to mycorrhizae

Mycorrhizal plants are often more resistant to diseases, such as those caused by microbial soil-borne pathogens. These associations have been found to assist in plant defense both above and belowground. Mycorrhizas have been found to excrete enzymes that are toxic to soil borne organisms such as nematodes. More recent studies have shown that mycorrhizal associations result in a priming effect of plants that essentially acts as a primary immune response. When this association is formed a defense response is activated similarly to the response that occurs when the plant is under attack. As a result of this inoculation, defense responses are stronger in plants with mycorrhizal associations.

AMF was also significantly correlated with soil biological fertility variables such as soil microbial communities and associated disease suppressiveness. Thus, ecosystem services provided by AMF may depend on the soil microbiome. Furthermore, AMF was significantly correlated with soil physical variable, but only with water level and not with aggregate stability. and are also more resistant to the effects of drought.
The significance of arbuscular mycorrhizal fungi includes alleviation of salt stress and its beneficial effects on plant growth and productivity. Although salinity can negatively affect arbuscular mycorrhizal fungi, many reports show improved growth and performance of mycorrhizal plants under salt stress conditions.

Resistance to insects

Plants connected by mycorrhizal fungi in mycorrhizal networks can use these underground connections to communicate warning signals. For example, when a host plant is attacked by an aphid, the plant signals surrounding connected plants of its condition. Both the host plant and those connected to it release volatile organic compounds that repel aphids and attract parasitoid wasps, predators of aphids. This assists the mycorrhizal fungi by conserving its food supply.

Colonization of barren soil
Plants grown in sterile soils and growth media often perform poorly without the addition of spores or hyphae of mycorrhizal fungi to colonise the plant roots and aid in the uptake of soil mineral nutrients. The absence of mycorrhizal fungi can also slow plant growth in early succession or on degraded landscapes. The introduction of alien mycorrhizal plants to nutrient-deficient ecosystems puts indigenous non-mycorrhizal plants at a competitive disadvantage. This aptitude to colonize barren soil is defined by the category Oligotroph.

Resistance to toxicity

Fungi have a protective role for plants rooted in soils with high metal concentrations, such as acidic and contaminated soils. Pine trees inoculated with Pisolithus tinctorius planted in several contaminated sites displayed high tolerance to the prevailing contaminant, survivorship and growth. One study discovered the existence of Suillus luteus strains with varying tolerance of zinc. Another study discovered that zinc-tolerant strains of Suillus bovinus conferred resistance to plants of Pinus sylvestris. This was probably due to binding of the metal to the extramatricial mycelium of the fungus, without affecting the exchange of beneficial substances.

Occurrence of mycorrhizal associations

Mycorrhizas are present in 92% of plant families studied (80% of species), with arbuscular mycorrhizas being the ancestral and predominant form, and the most prevalent symbiotic association found in the plant kingdom. The structure of arbuscular mycorrhizas has been highly conserved since their first appearance in the fossil record, with both the development of ectomycorrhizas, and the loss of mycorrhizas, evolving convergently on multiple occasions.

Associations of fungi with the roots of plants have been known since at least the mid-19th century. However early observers simply recorded the fact without investigating the relationships between the two organisms. This symbiosis was studied and described by Franciszek Kamieński in 1879–1882.

Climate change 

CO2 released by human activities is causing climate change and possible damage to mycorrhizae, but the direct effect of an increase in the gas should be to benefit plants and mycorrhizae. In Arctic regions, nitrogen and water are harder for plants to obtain, making mycorrhizae crucial to plant growth. Since mycorrhizae tend to do better in cooler temperatures, warming could be detrimental to them. Gases such as SO2, NO-x, and O3 produced by human activity may harm mycorrhizae, causing reduction in "propagules, the colonization of roots, degradation in connections between trees, reduction in the mycorrhizal incidence in trees, and reduction in the enzyme activity of ectomycorrhizal roots."

See also

 Effect of climate change on plant biodiversity
 Endosymbiont
 Epibiont, an organism that grows on another life form
 Endophyte
 Epiphyte
 Epiphytic fungus
 Mucigel
 Mycorrhizae and changing climate
 Mycorrhizal fungi and soil carbon storage
 Mycorrhizal network
 Plant to plant communication via mycorrhizal networks
 Rhizobia
 Suzanne Simard

References

External links

 International Mycorrhiza Society International Mycorrhiza Society
 Mohamed Hijri: A simple solution to the coming phosphorus crisis video recommending agricultural mycorrhiza use to conserve phosphorus reserves & 85% waste problem @Ted.com
 Mycorrhizal Associations: The Web Resource Comprehensive illustrations and lists of mycorrhizal and nonmycorrhizal plants and fungi
 Mycorrhizas – a successful symbiosis Biosafety research into genetically modified barley
 MycorWiki a portal concerned with the biology and ecology of ectomycorrhizal fungi and other forest fungi.

Plant roots
Soil biology
Symbiosis
Oligotrophs
Fungus ecology